The Perth Prohibited Area was an area of the metropolitan area in Perth, Western Australia that Aboriginal people were not permitted to enter without a permit. The prohibition was in force from 1927 to 1954, and covered approximately  wholly within the boundaries of the City of Perth. The ban was instigated by A. O. Neville, the protector of Aborigines, and proclaimed under the Aborigines Act 1905 (WA) in 1927.

Aboriginal people working in the city had to leave by 6pm or face the threat of arrest and a fine, or in some cases a custodial sentence. The edict was actively enforced, with the records of the Central Police Office showing 78 indigenous people charged from July 1949 to February 1950. The historian Stephen Kinnane has suggested that Neville did not like the fact that Aboriginals were beating white Australians at competitive events held in White City.

See also 

 Aboriginal history of Western Australia
 Sundown town, the American equivalent

References 

History of Perth, Western Australia
History of Indigenous Australians
Anti-indigenous racism in Australia